An Idiot Abroad is a travel documentary television series that was originally broadcast on Sky1 in the United Kingdom. The programme was created by and features Karl Pilkington and his former radio show colleagues Ricky Gervais and Stephen Merchant. , 20 episodes of An Idiot Abroad have aired over three series.

The first series aired between 23 September and 11 November 2010 and centred on Pilkington's journeys to the New Seven Wonders of the World (excluding the Colosseum, which was replaced by the Great Pyramids); it ran for eight episodes. In the second series, which aired 23 September – 11 November 2011, Pilkington participates in several popular "bucket list" activities, such as swimming with dolphins and climbing Mount Fuji; it also ran for eight episodes. A third series, a three-part special titled The Short Way Round, aired 30 November – 21 December 2012; in it, Karl was accompanied by Warwick Davis, who stars in Gervaiss situation comedy show Life's Too Short, on a trip loosely recreating Marco Polos 13th-century journey from Venice to China. Stephen Merchant did not participate in the third series.

The first two series have been released on DVD in Regions 1, 2, and 4. The third series has only been released on DVD in Region 2.

In February 2013, Science, which broadcast all three series in North America, began rebroadcasting episodes of An Idiot Abroad under the title An Idiot Abroad: Lost Luggage. Each Lost Luggage episode consists of the original episode and two brief, new "Lost Luggage" segments filmed at Gervaiss home in England which were not included in the original episode. In each "Lost Luggage" segment, Gervais and Pilkington hold a short discussion.

Series overview

Episodes

Series 1: The 7 Wonders (2010)

Series 2: The Bucket List (2011)

Series 3: The Short Way Round (2012)
The special was split into four parts, and aired at the end of 2012.

Lost Luggage (2013)
Rebroadcasts in North America on Science of episodes from previous series, each including two new "Lost Luggage" segments filmed at Gervaiss home in England in which Gervais and Pilkington hold brief discussions.

Notes

 Episode viewing figures from BARB.

References

Lists of British comedy television series episodes
Lists of British non-fiction television series episodes